Giacomo I Crispo (or Jacopo) (d. 1418) was the eleventh Duke of the Archipelago, etc., from 1397 to 1418, son of the tenth Duke Francesco I Crispo and wife Fiorenza I Sanudo, Lady of Milos, and brother of John II and William II.

He married his cousin Fiorenza Sommaripa, daughter of Gaspare Sommaripa, and wife Maria Sanudo.

According to William Miller, Giacomo died of the flux at Ferrara while travelling to meet Pope Martin V at Mantua. He had involved in arranging the retrocession of Corinth to the Byzantine Empire by the Knights of St. John prior to his death. In his will, Giacomo introduced the Salic Law to the Duchy by excluding his daughter from succession and made his brother John II Crispo his heir and successor.

References

1418 deaths
Giacomo 01
Giacomo 01
14th-century monarchs in Europe
15th-century monarchs in Europe
14th-century Venetian people
15th-century Venetian people